Stefan Bergman (5 May 1895 – 6 June 1977) was a Congress Poland-born American mathematician whose primary work was in complex analysis. His name is also written Bergmann; he dropped the second "n" when he came to the U. S. He is best known for the kernel function he discovered while at University of Berlin in 1922. This function is known today as the Bergman kernel. Bergman taught for many years at Stanford University, and served as an advisor to several students.

Biography 
Born in Częstochowa, Congress Poland, Russian Empire, to a German Jewish family, Bergman received his Ph.D. at University of Berlin in 1921 for a dissertation on Fourier analysis. His advisor, Richard von Mises, had a strong influence on him, lasting for the rest of his career. In 1933, Bergman was forced to leave his post at the Berlin University because he was a Jew. He fled first to Russia, where he stayed until 1939, and then to Paris. In 1939, he emigrated to the United States, where he would remain for the rest of life. He was elected a Fellow of the American Academy of Arts and Sciences in 1951. He was a professor at Stanford University from 1952 until his retirement in 1972. He was an invited speaker at the International Congress of Mathematicians in 1950 in Cambridge, Massachusetts and in 1962 in Stockholm (On meromorphic functions of several complex variables). He died in Palo Alto, California, aged 82.

The Bergman Prize 

The Stefan Bergman Prize in mathematics was initiated by Bergman's wife in her will, in memory of her husband's work. The American Mathematical Society supports the prize and selects the committee of judges. The prize is awarded for:

 the theory of the kernel function and its applications in real and complex analysis; or
 function-theoretic methods in the theory of partial differential equations of elliptic type with a special attention to Bergman's and  related operator methods.

Selected publications 
.
.
.

. The original edition was published in 1941 by Interscience Publishers.
.
The Kernel Function and Conformal Mapping, American Mathematical Society 1950, 2nd edn. 1970
with Menahem Max Schiffer: Kernel Functions and elliptic differential equations in mathematical physics, Academic Press 1953
with John G. Herriot: Application of the method of the kernel function for solving boundary value problems, Numerische Mathematik 3, 1961
Integral operators in the theory of linear partial differential equations, Springer 1961, 2nd edn. 1969

See also 
Bergman kernel
Bergman metric
Bergman space
Bergman–Weil integral representation

References

External links
Author profile in the database zbMATH

1895 births
1977 deaths
American people of Polish-Jewish descent
20th-century Polish mathematicians
Emigrants from the Russian Empire to Germany
German emigrants to the United States
Fellows of the American Academy of Arts and Sciences
Humboldt University of Berlin alumni
Academic staff of the Humboldt University of Berlin
Jewish American scientists
Complex analysts
Mathematical analysts
People from Częstochowa
PDE theorists
Stanford University Department of Mathematics faculty
People from Palo Alto, California
Brown University faculty
Yeshiva University faculty
Academic staff of Tomsk State University